David Benedek (born 3 June 1980 in Munich, West Germany) is a former professional snowboarder.
He was a co-founder of former US-based production company Robot Food, his creative work has been awarded by a variety of organisations including the Art Directors Club of Europe, the Red Dot and the IF Design Award.  Neon Magazine named him as one of the 100 most influential young Germans.

Competitive history
 Best Trick Award, Red Bull Gap Session, 2006 & 2008
 Transworld Readers Poll 2006 Standout of the Year
 Snowboarder Magazine Rider of the Year 2004
 Snowboarder Magazine Best Video Part of the Year 2004
 Snowboarder Magazine Rider of the Year 2003
 Snowboarder Magazine Best Video Part of the Year 2003 
 Burton European Open Winner 2003
 1st, Nokia Air & Style 2002

Snowboard films
 2002 Afterbang
 2003 Lame
 2004 Afterlame
 2005 91 Words for Snow
 2006 Red Bull Gap Session 2006
 2007 In Short

References

External links
 www.davidbenedek.com
 www.almostanything.com
 www.blankpaperstudio.com

German male snowboarders
Living people
1980 births
Sportspeople from Munich
German film producers
Film people from Munich